Rachel Joynt (born 1966 in County Kerry) is an Irish sculptor who has created some prominent Irish public art. She graduated from the National College of Art and Design in Dublin in 1989 with a degree in sculpture.

Her father, Dick Joynt, was also a sculptor. Rachel Joynt is preoccupied by ideas of place, history and nature, and her work often examines the past as a substrate of the present. Her commissions include People's Island (1988) in which brass footprints and bird feet criss-cross a well-traversed pedestrian island near Dublin's O'Connell Bridge. She collaborated with Remco de Fouw to make Perpetual Motion (1995), a large sphere with road markings which stands on the Naas dual carriageway. This has been described by Public Art Ireland as 'probably Ireland's best known sculpture' and was featured, as a visual shorthand for leaving Dublin, in The Apology, a Guinness advert.  Joynt also made the 900 underlit glass cobblestones which were installed in early 2005 along the edge of Dublin's River Liffey; many of these cobblestones contain bronze or silver fish.

Works in collections and on display

People's Island (1988) on the pedestrian island south of O'Connell Bridge, Dublin
A pavement piece depicting Viking crafts, outside Christ Church cathedral, Dublin.
Solas na Glasrai (The grocers' light) corner of Moore Street and Parnell Street, Dublin.
A brass light standard hung with casts of fish, fruit and vegetables
Perpetual  Motion (1995) (with Remco deFouw) Naas bypass, County Kildare.
RTE radio show about Perpetual Motion
A marble seat with inset bronze book at the Clare library headquarters in Ennis.
Clare Library historical webpage
Noah's Egg (2004) University College Dublin Veterinary School, Belfield, Dublin
Press release describing Noah's Egg
A series of underlit glass cobblestones along the Liffey campshires (2005).
Press release describing the Rachel Joynt cobblestones
Mothership Sculpture at the coastline in Glasthule, Dublin

References

Judith Hill (1998), Irish Public Sculpture. Dublin: Four Courts Press. .
Short biography linked to this page about a charity artpack

Irish sculptors
People from County Kerry
Irish women artists
Living people
1966 births